A charticle is a combination of text, images and graphics that takes the place of a full article. Unlike a traditional news article that usually consists of large blocks of text with occasional images or other graphics used to enhance the article's visual appeal or to convey some ancillary information, a charticle is composed primarily of an image with text used only sparingly to provide additional information.  The ratio of text to images is inverted in a charticle compared to a traditional article, essentially making it the graphic novel equivalent of a traditional news article.

Origins
Claims have been made that Van McKenzie, the sports editor at the Orlando Sentinel and St. Petersburg Times, incorporated graphics with text in the 1970s. Others claim that Edward Tufte, a pioneer in information design, is behind the charticle even though he has not coined the term.

See also
 Listicle
 Photo-essay
 Photo-editorial
 Infographic

References

Neologisms
Visual journalism